Yevgeny Zherbaev is a Russian freestyle wrestler. He won one of the bronze medals in the men's 70 kg event at the 2021 World Wrestling Championships held in Oslo, Norway.

Career 

In January 2015, he won one of the bronze medals in the men's 65 kg event at the Golden Grand Prix Ivan Yarygin 2015 held in Krasnoyarsk, Russia. Two months later, at the 2015 European U23 Wrestling Championship held in Walbrzych, Poland, he also won one of the bronze medals in the men's 65 kg event. In that same year, he also won a bronze medal in the men's 70 kg event at the 2015 Russian National Freestyle Wrestling Championships held in Kaspiysk, Dagestan, Russia.

In the men's 70 kg event, he also won bronze at the 2019 Russian National Freestyle Wrestling Championships in Sochi, Russia and the Golden Grand Prix Ivan Yarygin 2020. A year later, he won silver in that event at the 2021 Russian National Freestyle Wrestling Championships in Ulan-Ude, Russia.

Major results

References

External links 
 

Living people
1994 births
Russian male sport wrestlers
World Wrestling Championships medalists
21st-century Russian people